Volče (in older sources Vovče) is a village in the Municipality of Pivka in the Inner Carniola region of Slovenia.

The small church in the settlement is dedicated to Saint Peter and belongs to the Parish of Košana.

References

External links
Volče on Geopedia

Populated places in the Municipality of Pivka